Abraham Lansing (February 27, 1835 – October 4, 1899) was an American lawyer and politician.

Early life
Abraham Lansing was born in Albany, Albany County, New York.  He was the son of Christopher Yates Lansing (1796–1872) and Caroline Mary (née Thomas) Lansing (1805–1845).  Lansing was a grandson of state Treasurer Abraham G. Lansing, grand-nephew of Chancellor John Lansing, Jr., and nephew of Gerrit Y. Lansing.

Lansing attended The Albany Academy, graduated from Williams College with an A.B. in 1855, and was a member of The Kappa Alpha Society.  He read law with his father, graduated from Albany Law School in 1857, and later practiced law in partnership with his brother William.

Career
In 1868, he was appointed City Attorney of Albany, and in 1869 became the first New York Supreme Court reporter. He published the first seven volumes of the Supreme Court Reports.

From June 1, 1874, he was Acting New York State Treasurer, appointed by Governor John Adams Dix while Treasurer Thomas Raines was incapacitated due to a nervous breakdown, and was treated at the Utica State Asylum.  Raines resumed his duties on August 19, 1874.

In 1876, he was chosen Corporation Counsel of Albany. Elected as a Democrat, he was a member of the New York State Senate (17th D.) in 1882 and 1883. There he worked for the establishment of the State Railroad Commission and the Niagara Falls State Park.

He was a director of the National Commercial Bank, trustee of the Albany Savings Bank, Park Commissioner of Albany, Governor of the Albany Hospital, trustee of The Albany Academy, the Albany Medical College, the Albany Rural Cemetery, the Dudley Observatory. In 1879 he was an American delegate to the International Conference (London) for the Codification of the Law of Nations.

Personal life
On November 26, 1873, he married Catherine Gansevoort (1838–1918), the daughter of Peter Gansevoort (1789–1876) and Mary (née Sanford) Gansevoort (1814–1841).  She was a granddaughter of Peter Gansevoort and Nathan Sanford.  They did not have any children.

Lansing died in Albany on October 4, 1899, and was buried at the Albany Rural Cemetery at Menands, New York.

References
Notes

Sources
Raines reinstated, New York Times, August 20, 1874 
Recollections: Abraham Lansing.  1909.  Charles E. Fitch, editor.  De Vinne Press, publisher.

External links
Lansing Political Graveyard

1835 births
1899 deaths
Williams College alumni
Albany Law School alumni
New York (state) lawyers
Democratic Party New York (state) state senators
New York State Treasurers
Politicians from Albany, New York
Burials at Albany Rural Cemetery
19th-century American politicians
Lawyers from Albany, New York
The Albany Academy alumni
19th-century American lawyers
Lansing family
Gansevoort family